The Dudhwa Tiger Reserve is a protected area in Uttar Pradesh that stretches mainly across the Lakhimpur Kheri and Bahraich districts and comprises the Dudhwa National Park, Kishanpur Wildlife Sanctuary and Katarniaghat Wildlife Sanctuary. It shares the north-eastern boundary with Nepal, which is defined to a large extent by the Mohana River. The area is a vast alluvial floodplain traversed by numerous rivers and streams flowing in south-easterly direction.

History 
In 1987, the Dudhwa National Park and the Kishanpur Wildlife Sanctuary were brought under the purview of the ‘Project Tiger’ as Dudhwa Tiger Reserve. The Katarniaghat Wildlife Sanctuary was added in the year 2000. It is one of India's 53 Tiger Reserves.

Fauna
The protected area is home for tigers, leopards, Asiatic black bears, sloth bears, Swamp deer, rhinoceros, elephants, cheetal, hog deer, barking deer, sambar, wild boar and hispid hare.

Tigers
In 2006, the tiger population of the Dudhwa-Kheri-Pilibhit conservation complex was estimated as comprising 80–110 tigers. Until 2010, the population had increased to an estimated 106–118 tigers and was considered stable.

The reintroduced tiger 

In July 1976, Billy Arjan Singh acquired a tiger cub named Tara from Twycross Zoo in the United Kingdom, hand reared her and later reintroduced her to the wild in the Dudhwa National Park with the permission of India's then Prime Minister Indira Gandhi.

In the 1990s, some tigers from the protected area were observed to have the typical appearance of Siberian tigers, namely a large head, pale fur, white complexion, and wide stripes, and were suspected to be Bengal-Siberian tiger hybrids. Billy Arjan Singh sent hair samples of tigers from the national park to the Centre for Cellular and Molecular Biology in Hyderabad where the samples were analysed using mitochondrial sequence analysis. Results revealed that the tigers in question had a Bengal tiger mitochondrial haplotype indicating that their mother was a Bengal tiger.
Skin, hair and blood samples from 71 tigers collected in various Indian zoos, in the National Museum in Kolkata and including two samples from Dudhwa National Park were prepared for microsatellite analysis that revealed that two tigers had alleles in two loci contributed by Bengal and Siberian tiger subspecies. However, samples of two hybrid specimens constituted too small a sample base to conclusively assume that Tara was the source of the Siberian tiger genes.

Visitor information
Dudhwa National Park Visitors Entrance and Service Centre is at: .

In 2019, it was announced that a visitors centre built at the Tiger Reserve would inform tourists about Tharu heritage and sell local products. Arti Rana is one of the coordinators and she is of Tharu heritage.

See also
Pilibhit Tiger Reserve

References

External links 
The Hindu

Tiger reserves in Uttar Pradesh
Lakhimpur Kheri district
1987 establishments in Uttar Pradesh
Protected areas established in 1987